Ossian is an Anglicised form of the Irish Oisín and the Scottish Gaelic Oisein. The latter names are derived from a byname constructed from the element os ("stag"). Another Anglicised form of Oisín is Osian.

Ossian was one of several names popularised by the romantic works of James Macpherson (died 1796), composer of so-called Ossianic poetry. In consequence, it and other Ossianic names—such as Malvina, Minona, Orla, Oscar, and Selma—were enthusiastically adopted in Scandinavia in the nineteenth century. The specific adoption of Ossian in Denmark does not appear to have been a direct result of the works of Macpherson, however, but owes its popularity there as an import from Sweden. In this way Ossian is similar to the Ossianic names Oscar and Selma which were introduced into Denmark by Swedish immigrants.

People with the name
 Ossian Berger (1849–1914), Swedish politician and lawyer
 Ossian Brown, English musician and artist
 Ossian D'Ambrosio (born 1970), Italian modern Druid, musician and jeweler
 Ossian Donner (1866–1957), Finnish industrialist, engineer, senator and diplomat
 Ossian B. Hart (1821–1874), tenth Governor of Florida, lawyer and Florida Supreme Court justice
 Ossian Everett Mills (1856–1920), founder of Phi Mu Alpha Sinfonia fraternity
 Ossian Ray (1835–1892), American politician
 Ossian Cole Simonds (1855–1931), American landscape designer
 Ossian Skiöld (1889–1961), Swedish hammer thrower
 Ossian Smyth, Irish Green Party politician
 Ossian Sweet (1895–1960), African-American physician and one of the defendants in the Sweet Trials
 Ossian Wuorenheimo (1845–1917), Finnish politician and member of the Senate of Finland

Fictional people with the name
 Ossian, narrator and purported author of a cycle of epic poems composed by the Scottish poet James Macpherson from 1760
 Oisín (also spelt Ossian in English), in Irish mythology the greatest poet of Ireland and a warrior

Citations

References

English-language masculine given names
Danish masculine given names
Irish masculine given names
Scandinavian masculine given names
Scottish masculine given names
Swedish masculine given names